Suzi Carla Barbosa is a Bissau-Guinean politician, member of parliament and coordinator of the Committee of Women Parliamentarians of Guinea-Bissau.

Career 
Suzi Barbosa is an advocate for the participation of women in the national political affairs of Guinea-Bissau. She was part of the feminist movement in Guinea-Bissau among women from Bafatá Region  who avoided voting in elections if women were not featured on the contestants list. She indicated that "Guinea-Bissau has a population mostly made up of women and it is very sad to see that they do not have the same opportunities as men, especially in decision-making positions, if they had perhaps the country's situation in terms of stability would have been different”.

She was a delegate at the first conference of Women's Circle of the National Assembly in Quebec City in 2017, made up of politicians from French speaking countries, gathered to build capacity for female world leaders.

As of 2016, she was the Secretary of State for International Cooperation and Communities in Guinea-Bissau.

On July 3, 2019, she became Minister of Foreign Affairs.

References

Living people
Year of birth missing (living people)
21st-century women politicians
Female foreign ministers
Foreign Ministers of Guinea-Bissau
Members of the National People's Assembly (Guinea-Bissau)
People from Bafatá Region
Women government ministers of Guinea-Bissau